Raymond Sidney Podloski (January 5, 1966 – May 29, 2018) was a Canadian-Austrian professional ice hockey player. He played eight games in the National Hockey League with the Boston Bruins during the 1988–89 season. The rest of his career, which lasted from 1986 to 2005, was mainly spent in Europe. Internationally Podloski played for the Canadian national team for a time, before gaining Austrian citizenship and playing for the Austrian national team at the 1999 World Championship.

Podloski died of complications from a heart attack in 2018 at the age of 52.

Career statistics

Regular season and playoffs

International

References

External links
 

1966 births
2018 deaths
Asiago Hockey 1935 players
Austrian ice hockey centres
Bolzano HC players
Boston Bruins draft picks
Boston Bruins players
Canadian ice hockey centres
EC KAC players
EC Kapfenberg players
EC VSV players
EHC Black Wings Linz players
EHC Lustenau players
Kassel Huskies players
Maine Mariners players
Moncton Golden Flames players
Portland Winterhawks players
Red Deer Rustlers players
Ice hockey people from Edmonton
Vienna Capitals players
Vojens IK players